Statistics of League of Ireland in the 1977–78 season.

Overview
It was contested by 16 teams, and Bohemians won the championship.

Final classification

Results

Top scorers

League Of Ireland, 1977-78
1977–78 in Republic of Ireland association football
League of Ireland seasons